The 1979 Tennessee State Tigers football team represented Tennessee State University as an independent during the 1979 NCAA Division I-A football season. Led by 17-year head coach John Merritt, the Tigers compiled a record of 8–3.

Schedule

References

Tennessee State
Tennessee State Tigers football seasons
Black college football national champions
Tennessee State Tigers football